The Battle of Agueddin was a battle between the Emirate of Abdelkader and the Alaouite Dynasty of Morocco that took place in December 1847.

Background
Emir Abdelkader was outlawed in Morocco following the Treaty of Tangiers. This led to a series of confrontations between him and the Moroccan forces in which even an assassin had been sent in an attempt to kill him, these tensions ultimately led to the Battle of Oued Aslaf which resulted in an Algerian victory.

On the 9th of December Emir Abdelkaders camp was situated in Agueddin, the very next day he was warned of a Moroccan army of 50,000 men split into three divisions and led by the two sons of Abd al-Rahman, Moulay Mohammed and Moulay Soliman.

Battle
On the 11th of December Emir Abdelkader gathered 1,200 cavalry and 800 infantry and prepared for battle. At night camels that were covered with halfa, which had been dipped in tar and pitch were driven in the front of the column. After marching for two hours, Abdelkader encountered the first Moroccan division, he then set fire to the halfa covered camels and they plunged against the Moroccan cavalry. The Moroccans were bewildered, terrified and ultimately defeated, abandoning their tents, arms and baggage. Emir Abdelkader advanced and surprised and defeated the second Moroccan division in the same manner as the first.

Emir Abdelkader advanced on to the third division where he was checked by heavy fire, as a result he withdrew and took position. By mid-day 5,000 Moroccan cavalrymen set out to attack Abdelkader who calmly waited for them. When they were at charging distance he led his men to attack them, ploughing through them and shaking them off using a skillful combination of assault and retreat Abdelkader was successful.

Aftermath
Although Abdelkader was able to defeat the Moroccans during all of the earlier military engagements, they still advanced, but cautiously. Emir Abdelkader made the decision to withdraw from Algeria and enter French territory which ultimately led to his surrender.

References

1840s in Algeria
1840s in Morocco
Agueddin
Agueddin
Agueddin